Air Chief Marshal Sir Hugh William Lumsden Saunders,  (24 August 1894 – 8 May 1987) was a South African aviator who rose through the ranks to become a senior Royal Air Force commander.

RAF career

Saunders enlisted with the Witwatersrand Rifles Regiment in 1914 at the start of the First World War and then served in the South African Rifles before becoming a pilot in No. 84 Squadron of the Royal Flying Corps, and sometimes flew as a wingman of fellow South African, RAF flying ace Andrew Beauchamp-Proctor. He became a triple ace, with 15 victories credited to him. He was promoted to squadron leader on 29 May 1929. He was appointed Officer Commanding No. 45 Squadron in 1932.

Saunders served in the Second World War, initially as Chief of Staff for the Royal New Zealand Air Force before becoming Air Officer Administration at Headquarters Fighter Command in February 1942 and then being made Air Officer Commanding No. 11 Group in November 1942. He was made Director-General of Personnel at the Air Ministry in November 1944.

At the end of the war, he was made Air Officer Commanding RAF Burma before becoming Air Officer Commanding-in-Chief Bomber Command in January 1947. He went on to be Air Member for Personnel in October 1947, Inspector-General of the RAF in October 1949 and Commander-in-Chief at Headquarters Air Forces Western Europe in February 1951. He was appointed Air Deputy to Supreme Allied Commander Europe and retired in September 1953.

Post retirement
Following a series of fatal accidents in the newly established Royal Danish Air Force (RDAF), Saunders was invited to serve as a special advisor to the Minister of Defence of Denmark in 1954, in order to reorganise and, it was envisioned, bring the number of accidents in RDAF down. Saunders indeed reorganised the RDAF and, realising that most of the equipment/planes were of a tactical nature, established Tactical Air Command Denmark as the supreme HQ of RDAF. In addition, a number of specialist commands were established, training improved and gradually the accident rate fell. He served in Denmark until 1956 and received the Grand Cross of the Order of the Dannebrog for his service.

References

 

|-
 

|-
 

|-

|-

|-

1894 births
1987 deaths
Royal Flying Corps officers
Royal Air Force air marshals
British World War I flying aces
Royal Air Force personnel of World War II
Knights Grand Cross of the Order of the Bath
Knights Commander of the Order of the British Empire
Recipients of the Military Cross
Recipients of the Military Medal
Recipients of the Distinguished Flying Cross (United Kingdom)
Commanders with Star of the Order of Polonia Restituta
Commanders of the Legion of Merit
Officiers of the Légion d'honneur
Grand Crosses of the Order of the Dannebrog
People from Germiston